Guðmundur Felix Grétarsson (born 1972) is an Icelandic former electrician who lost both arms while working on the job. At the age of 48, Guðmundur Felix received a double-arm and shoulder transplant from doctors in France. The transplant was deemed successful.

Injury
On January 12, 1998, Guðmundur Felix was working as an electrician in Reykjavík, Iceland. He was working on a set of powerlines when he grabbed one of the wires. 11,000 volts and 100 amps jumped through his arms, burning them. He fell breaking his back and neck. After being taken to the hospital, doctors deemed his arms too damaged to be saved. He underwent amputation on both arms followed by multiple surgeries over the next eleven months. In total, Guðmundur Felix underwent 54 surgeries in the first year.

Double-arm transplant

In 2007, Guðmundur Felix approached a French doctor giving a lecture at an Icelandic university. The doctor agreed to look into his case. Several years later in 2011, he was asked to come to France for further medical testing. The surgery was planned and Guðmundur Felix was placed on the donor list in September 2016. On January 13, 2021, Guðmundur Felix went under for the double-arm transplant. The surgery lasted 15 hours.

References

1972 births
Living people
Icelandic people with disabilities
Electricians